Creswell is a town in Washington County, North Carolina, United States. The population was 276 at the 2010 census.

Geography
Creswell is located at  (35.870190, -76.393791).

The town is located in the North Carolina Inner Banks on the north-central portion of the Albemarle-Pamlico Peninsula, and along the western edge of the southern portions of the Scuppernong River.

Demographics

As of the census of 2000, there were 278 people, 118 households, and 86 families residing in the town. The population density was 666.0 people per square mile (255.6/km2). There were 141 housing units at an average density of 337.8 per square mile (129.6/km2). The racial makeup of the town was 50.00% White, 39.93% African American, 0.36% Native American, 0.36% Asian, 1.80% Pacific Islander, 4.68% from other races, and 2.88% from two or more races. Hispanic or Latino of any race were 6.83% of the population.

There were 118 households, out of which 28.0% had children under the age of 18 living with them, 40.7% were married couples living together, 27.1% had a female householder with no husband present, and 27.1% were non-families. 24.6% of all households were made up of individuals, and 13.6% had someone living alone who was 65 years of age or older. The average household size was 2.36 and the average family size was 2.77.

In the town, the population was spread out, with 22.3% under the age of 18, 10.4% from 18 to 24, 19.1% from 25 to 44, 24.1% from 45 to 64, and 24.1% who were 65 years of age or older. The median age was 43 years. For every 100 females, there were 78.2 males. For every 100 females age 18 and over, there were 77.0 males.

The median income for a household in the town was $20,833, and the median income for a family was $23,750. Males had a median income of $25,000 versus $16,500 for females. The per capita income for the town was $11,769. About 18.3% of families and 26.1% of the population were below the poverty line, including 41.1% of those under the age of eighteen and 20.3% of those 65 or over.

History
Creswell was incorporated in 1874, and named for John Angel James Creswell, the United States Postmaster General at that time. The structures in downtown Creswell are some of North Carolina's best remaining examples of downtown architecture from the late 19th century.

The Belgrade and St. David's Church, Creswell Historic District, Davenport House, and Somerset Place State Historic Site are listed on the National Register of Historic Places.

Transportation

Highways and roads
The town can be accessed from the east or west by U.S. Highway 64, and from the north or south by North Carolina Highway 94.

Creswell is within  of these destinations:

  - Columbia
  - Edenton
  - Plymouth
  - Williamston
  - Elizabeth City
  - Manteo
  - Nags Head
  - Washington
  - Greenville
  - Norfolk, Virginia
  - Virginia Beach, Virginia
  - Raleigh

  - Richmond, Virginia
  - Durham
  - Wilmington
  - Greensboro
  - Winston-Salem
  - Myrtle Beach, South Carolina
  - Washington, D.C.
  - Roanoke, Virginia
  - Dover, Delaware
  - Charlotte
  - Baltimore, Maryland
  - Atlantic City, New Jersey

Airports
Air travel is best served through the Norfolk International Airport (ORF) in Norfolk, Virginia or the Pitt-Greenville Airport (PGV) in Greenville, North Carolina

Politics

Town government
The Mayor of Creswell is Edwin Ray Blount.

Elected members to the Town Council:
 Syble J. Spruill
 Gerald Woodley
 Ron Ambrose
 J. D. Melton

State government
Creswell is served in the North Carolina General Assembly by State Senator Stan White (Democrat)  and State Representative Tim Spear (Democrat).

Federal government
The town is also served in the United States Congress by U.S. Senator Richard Burr (Republican), U.S. Senator Kay Hagan (Democrat) and U.S. Representative G. K. Butterfield (Democrat).

Recent issues
The Town of Creswell is aligned with a group called North Carolinians Opposed to the Outlying Landing Field. This group opposes a United States Navy proposal to construct an outlying landing field near the Pocosin Lakes National Wildlife Refuge in Washington County.

Attractions
 Gravesite of J. Johnston Pettigrew - famous Civil War general who lived in the area
 Somerset Place - former plantation home that now operates as a state historic site
 Pettigrew State Park
 Lake Phelps
 Albemarle Sound
 Pocosin Lakes National Wildlife Refuge
 Davenport Homestead

The town symbol, an artesian well hand-pump, can be found on Main Street in heart of downtown.

Notable people
 Ebenezer Pettigrew - US House of Representatives to the 24th Congress
 Elmo Langley - race car driver and owner, NASCAR pace car driver
 J. Johnston Pettigrew - Confederate general, author and representative to the South Carolina legislature

Education
Creswell Elementary School
Creswell High School
Pocosin Innovative Charter

Media

Newspaper
Creswell is served by the weekly Roanoke Beacon newspaper from Plymouth,, North Carolina, and the daily Washington Daily News from Washington, North Carolina.

Television
Creswell is part of the Greenville–Washington–New Bern–Morehead City market, which is the 107th largest in 2006, according to Nielsen Media Research. Broadcast television stations serving the market include:

 WUND-TV the (2) Columbia PBS affiliate, (part of the UNC-TV Network)
 WITN-TV the (7) Washington/Greenville/New Bern NBC affiliate
 WFXI-TV the (8) Morehead City Fox affiliate
 WNCT-TV the (9) Greenville CBS affiliate
 WCTI-TV the (12) New Bern ABC affiliate

References

Towns in North Carolina
Towns in Washington County, North Carolina
Populated places established in 1874
1874 establishments in North Carolina